Oh, For a Man! is a 1930 American black-and-white musical comedy film based on a short story, "Stolen Thunder" by Mary F. Watkins. The original story appeared in The Saturday Evening Post June 7, 1930. Lugosi's character of Frescatti was later added to the screenplay. Well-dressed with a goatee, he resembled his Dr. Benet role in The Invisible Ray (1936) in stills. Since the criminal of the story does not receive just punishment in the end, the producers were years later unable to reissue this film after the establishment of the production code.

Production of the film (originally to be called "Stolen Thunder") began on September 13, 1930. It premiered theatrically on Nov. 28th. Although they lauded the cast, direction and music, most of the critics found the storyline "nothing to rave about" and Reginald Denny's Irish brogue annoying.

Plot
A talented diva named Carlotta Manson steers clear of romantic relationships because she doesn't want to interfere with her career. Bela Lugosi has a relatively small role as her singing teacher, and in one of his only scenes, Carlotta makes a comical remark to him about one of her co-stars smelling like garlic (ironic in light of Lugosi's later involvement with "Dracula"). One night when she returns home, she is robbed by a thief named Barney McGann. When the opera-loving Barney learns his victim is his idol, he befriends her and they begin a romance. Carlotta even gets him a job in the chorus and proposes marriage to him. They go off to an Italian villa, but Barney changes his mind and walks out on her. Carlotta returns to New York to resume her singing career, but later Barney follows her there and they wind up reunited with a kiss.

Cast
	
Jeanette MacDonald as Carlotta Manson
Reginald Denny as Barney McGann
Warren Hymer as "Pug" Morini
Marjorie White as Totsy Franklin
Alison Skipworth as Laura
Albert Conti as Peck
Bela Lugosi as Frescatti, a goatee-wearing singing teacher
André Cheron as Costello
William B. Davidson as Kerry Stokes
Donald Hall as Carlotta's Backstage Admirer
Bodil Rosing as masseuse
Althea Henley as June, Dowager's homely daughter
Gino Corrado as Signor Ferrari, Italian Master of Ceremonies (uncredited)
Mary Gordon as Stage door admirer with violets (uncredited)
Evelyn Hall as Emily, dressing room dowager (uncredited)

Soundtrack
"Liebestod"
(uncredited)
from "Tristan und Isolde"
Music by Richard Wagner
"Im Just Nuts About You"
Written by William Kernell

References

External links
 
 
 

1930 films
1930 musical comedy films
1930 romantic comedy films
American musical comedy films
American romantic comedy films
American romantic musical films
American black-and-white films
Fox Film films
Films directed by Hamilton MacFadden
1930s romantic musical films
1930s American films
Silent romantic comedy films